The general secretary of the Central Committee of the Chinese Communist Party is the head of the Chinese Communist Party (CCP), the sole ruling party of the People's Republic of China (PRC). Since 1989, the CCP general secretary has been the paramount leader of the PRC.

According to the Constitution of the Chinese Communist Party, the general secretary serves as an ex officio member of the Politburo Standing Committee, China's de facto top decision-making body. The general secretary is also the head of the Secretariat. Since 1989, the holder of the post has been, except for transitional periods, the Chairman of the Central Military Commission, making the holder the supreme commander of the People's Liberation Army. The position of general secretary is the highest authority leading China's National People's Congress, State Council, Political Consultative Conference, Supreme People's Court and Supreme People's Procuratorate in the Chinese government. As the top leader of the world's largest economy by GDP purchasing power parity (PPP), the second largest economy by GDP nominal, the largest military in the world by personnel, a recognized nuclear weapons state, U.N. Security Council permanent member, and a potential superpower, the general secretary is considered to be one of the world's most powerful political figures.

The CCP general secretary is nominally elected by the Central Committee of the Chinese Communist Party. In practice, the de facto method of selecting the general secretary has varied over time. The two most recent general secretaries, Hu Jintao and Xi Jinping, were first elevated to the position of first Secretary of the Secretariat in the same process used to determine the membership and roles of the CCP Politburo Standing Committee. Under this informal process, the first secretary would be chosen during deliberations by incumbent Politburo members and retired Politburo Standing Committee members in the lead up to a Party Congress. The first secretary would later succeed the retiring general secretary as part of a generational leadership transition at the subsequent party congress.

The incumbent general secretary is Xi Jinping, who took office on 15 November 2012 and was re-elected twice on 25 October 2017 and 23 October 2022 respectively. Xi was speculated to rule the party and the country after the 20th National Congress in 2022, removing the previous de facto two-term limit, which was confirmed at the Congress. The last person to rule the country for more than two terms was Mao Zedong, who served as Chairman of the CCP Central Committee from 1945 until his death in 1976.

Powers and position 
Since the abolition of the post of Chairman of the Chinese Communist Party by the 12th Central Committee in 1982, the general secretary has been the highest-ranking official of the party and heads the Central Secretariat, Politburo and its Standing Committee.

Since its revival in 1982, the post of general secretary has been the highest office in the CCP, though it did not become the most powerful post until Deng Xiaoping's retirement in 1990. As China is a one-party state, the general secretary holds ultimate power and authority over state and government, and is usually considered the "paramount leader" of China. However, most of the people until Xi Jinping who have held the post have held far less power than Mao Zedong. Since the mid-1990s, the general secretary has traditionally also held the post of president of China. While the presidency is a ceremonial post, it is customary for the general secretary to assume the presidency to confirm his status as head of state.

Since Xi Jinping's election, two new bodies of the CCP, the National Security Commission and Central Comprehensively Deepening Reforms Commission, have been established, ostensibly concentrating political power in the "paramount leader" to a greater degree than anyone since Mao. These bodies were tasked with establishing the general policy direction for national security as well as the agenda for economic reform. Both groups are headed by the CCP general secretary, thus the power of the general secretary has become more concentrated.

List of general secretaries

See also 
 Office of the General Secretary of the Chinese Communist Party
 Leadership core
 Orders of precedence in China
 First Secretary of the Chinese Communist Party
 Secretary-general of the Chinese Communist Party

Notes

References 

 
Leaders of political parties in China
1921 establishments in China